David Day (September 19, 1825 – 1896) was a politician from Minnesota Territory and a former member of the Minnesota Territory House of Representatives, representing Long Prairie, Minnesota. He was born in Burke's Garden, Virginia. In 1846 he moved to Wisconsin to work as a miner. In his spare time and during winters he studied medicine, graduating from the University of Pennsylvania School of Medicine in 1849. After graduating he relocated to St. Paul, Minnesota where he worked in the drug business.

Day was elected to the Minnesota Territory House of Representatives in 1851. He served as speaker from 1853 to 1854. While he did not serve in the state legislature again, he was appointed to several different state commissions and committees and retired from his medicine business in 1866. He died in St. Paul in 1896.

References

1896 deaths
1825 births
Members of the Minnesota Territorial Legislature
People from Tazewell County, Virginia
Perelman School of Medicine at the University of Pennsylvania alumni
19th-century American politicians